Boris Isaac Korenblum (Борис Исаакович Коренблюм, 12 August 1923, Odessa, now Ukraine – 15 December 2011, Slingerlands, New York) was a Soviet-Israeli-American mathematician, specializing in mathematical analysis.

Boris Korenblum was a child prodigy in music, languages, and mathematics. He started as a violinist at the famous School of Stolyarsky in Odessa. After he won a young mathematicians competition, the family was given an apartment in Kiev, an extraordinary event. Boris was given a mentor, a local mathematics professor, who would peremptorily supervise his course of self study. To the great chagrin of his mother, Boris decided against pursuing a music career. In June 1941, when the war began, he volunteered, not yet having reached the draft age, for the Soviet Army. Because of his fluency in German, he served in a reconnaissance unit. Some of his tasks was going to the enemy lines to capture a prisoner for interrogation. He was also the one to interpret to his commanding officers when a prisoner was taken. Once, refusing to beat a prisoner who was talking already, he quarrelled with the superior officer, and was punished by being sent to a penal battalion. There, he served with, and made fast wartime friends with, some rough characters, many of whom were discharged from penal colonies "to wash with their blood the offences against the Motherland." He later told his family that this experience, together with the inevitable maturing during a bloody war, made a man out of a soft city boy with a doting Jewish mother. After some time, the need for competent interpreters saw him return to his unit, where he served with distinction to the end of the war. His awards, including an Order of the Red Banner, were taken from him when he emigrated to Israel in November 1973.

Coming home from the war, he passed all the exams for the undergraduate degree in mathematics in a few of  months, and was admitted for graduate study at the Institute of Mathematics of the National Academy of Sciences of Ukraine where he received in 1947 his Candidate of Sciences degree (PhD) under the direction of Evgeny Yakovlevich Remez. Korenblum received in 1956 his Russian Doctorate of Sciences (habilitation) from Moscow State University. He was dismissed from the Institute of Mathematics at the height of the anti-Semitic campaign (together with all other Jewish and also half-Jewish scientists) around 1952, and afterwards became a Professor of Mathematics at the Institute of Civil Engineering thanks to heroic efforts by Professor Yury Dmitrievich Sokolov (1896–1971). (In the political atmosphere of the time, Sokolov risked the loss of his own position.) Boris Korenblum worked there until his emigration to Israel.

From 1974 to 1977 Korenblum was a professor of mathematics at Tel Aviv University. In 1977 he was at the Institute for Advanced Study in Princeton, New Jersey. He was a professor at the University at Albany, SUNY from 1977 until his retirement in 2009 as professor emeritus.

Korenblum's research dealt with classical harmonic analysis, functional analysis, Banach algebras, and complex analysis. He was an Invited Speaker at the ICM in 1978 in Helsinki. In November 2003 a conference was held in Barcelona to celebrate the occasion of his 80th birthday. He is survived by his wife, his children, and a granddaughter.

Selected publications
“A generalization of Wiener's Tauberian theorem and harmonic analysis of rapidly increasing functions”, Proc. (Trudy) Moscow Math. Soc., 1958, v. 7, 121–148.
“Closed ideals of ring An, Func. Anal. and Applic. (Moscow), 1972, v. 6, 38–52.

with Edward Thomas: 

with Leon Brown: “Cyclic vectors in A–∞, Proc. Amer. Math. Soc., 1987, v. 101, 137–138. 
with Joaquim Bruna: 
“Transformation of zero sets by contractive operators in the Bergman space”, Bull. Sci. Math. (2), 1990, v. 114, 385–394.
“A maximum principle for the Bergman space”, Publicacions Math., 1991, v. 35, 479–486. 
with Kendall Richards: 
with R. O’Neil, K. Richards, and K. Zhu: 
with Kehe Zhu: "An application of Tauberian theorems to Toeplitz operators." Journal of Operator Theory, 1995, 353–361. 
with A. Mascuilli and J. Panariello: 
with Håkan Hedenmalm and Kehe Zhu: Theory of Bergman Spaces, Springer, 2000.
with John C. Racquet: “Concurrence of Uniqueness and Boundedness Conditions for Regular Sequences”, Complex Variables, 2000, v. 41, 231–239. 
with Catherine Beneteau: “Jensen type inequalities and radial null sets”, Analysis, 2001, v. 21, 99–105.
with Emmanuel Rashba: “Classical properties of low-dimensional conductors”, Phys. Rev. Lett., 2002, v. 89, no. 9. 
with C. Beneteau: “Some coefficient estimates for Hp functions”, Proc. of the International Conference in Karmiel (Israel), 2004.

References

External links
 Korenblum, Boris I., mathnet.ru
A Slideshow in Memory of Boris Korenblum (page by Daniel Korenblum, use left and right arrow keys to change slides)

1923 births
2011 deaths
Complex analysts
Mathematical analysts
Soviet mathematicians
Israeli mathematicians
20th-century American mathematicians
21st-century American mathematicians
Moscow State University alumni
Academic staff of Tel Aviv University
University at Albany, SUNY faculty
Soviet emigrants to Israel
Israeli emigrants to the United States